Pierre Wissmer (30 October 1915 – 4 November 1992) was a 20th-century French classical composer of Swiss origin.

Biography 
Formed at the Conservatoire de Musique de Genève, he received the advice of Robert Casadesus before perfecting his mastery of counterpoint at the Schola Cantorum de Paris with Daniel-Lesur. He also followed the course of conducting of Charles Münch at the École normale de musique de Paris.

His first piano concerto was created on the radio by Jacqueline Blancard 10 October 1937 under the direction of Henri Tomasi. In 1938, his first symphony was directed in Winterthur by Hermann Scherchen.

In 1939, Pierre Wissmer composed Le beau dimanche, one-act ballet on an argument by Pierre Guérin who put him in touch with Stravinski, Poulenc, Sauguet, and Cocteau. In 1944, he was appointed professor of composition at Conservatoire de Genève and head of the Department of chamber music at Radio Geneva.

In 1948, he married the pianist Laure-Anne Étienne, a student of Marguerite Long at Conservatoire de Paris. From 1952 to 1957, he was deputy director of programs at Radio Luxembourg and, from 1957, director of the Schola Cantorum. In 1958 he adopted French citizenship and later was appointed director of the École normale de musique of Le Mans (1969–1981).

In 1967, he was awarded the Grand Prix musical of the city of Paris.

In 1992, he died in Valcros, shortly after his wife.

Works

Incidental music 
1945: Marion ou la Belle au Tricorne, radio opera (Geneva, Radio Suisse Romande, 16 April 1947)
1952: Capitaine Bruno, opéra comique (Geneva, 9 November)
1958: Léonidas ou la Cruauté mentale, opéra bouffe (Paris, 12 September)
1939: Le Beau Dimanche, ballet (Geneva, 20 March 1944)
1963: Alerte, puits, ballet (Geneva, 1964)
1967: Christina et les chimères, ballet (French Television, 7 December 1972)

Orchestral music 
 9 Symphonies (1938, 1951, 1955, 1962, 1969, 1977, 1900)
 3 piano concertos (1937, 1948, 1971)
1937: Mouvement, for string orchestra (Geneva, 25 February 1938)
1938: Divertissement sur un choral for 11 instruments (Geneva, 8 December 1939)
1943: Antoine et Cléopâtre, suite symphonique (Geneva, 2 October 1946)
1952: Mandrellina, overture (Geneva, 16 April 1952)
1957: Concerto for guitar
1960: Concerto for clarinet
1961: Concerto for trumpet
1963: Concerto for oboe
1966: Concerto valcrosiano 
1966: Concertino-Croisière for flute, string orchestra and piano
1972: Triptyque romand 
1974: Dialogue for bassoon (or cello) and orchestra
1982: Symphonietta concertante, for flute, harp and orchestra

Chamber music 
 3 String quartets (1937, 1949, 1972)
1938: Sérénade for oboe, clarinet and bassoon
1941: Sonatine for clarinet and piano
1946: Sonatine for violon and piano 
1949: Sonate for piano
1956: Quartet for saxophones 
1961: Quadrige for flute, violin, cello and piano
1962: Sonate for flute and guitar
1964: Quintette à vent 
1973: “Réflexions” for organ
1975: Variations sur un Noël imaginaire for organ (also for orchestra, 1975) 
1978: Trio adelfiano, for flute, cello and piano

Vocal music 
1942: Naïades pour récitant, soloists, choir and orchestra (Geneva, 21 January)
1962: Hérétique et relapse, one-act mystery
1965: Le Quatrième Mage, oratorio (Paris, 14 October 1969)
1971: Cantique en l'ounour dou grand saintlouis, rei de franco et patroun de vaucros de cuers, pour choir with piano or organ
1951: Chants de Mars: 7  chœurs a cappella pour 3 voix d'enfants sur des poésies de René de Obaldia.(Paris 1951)

Selected discography 
Pierre Wissmer left a work that is both abundant and diverse with respect to both instrumental music, chamber music, concert music and music for symphonic orchestra, vocal or choral music, opera or musical theatre, incidental music, ballets, music for radio or television and film score.

 Trio adelfiano for flute, cello and piano/Quadrige for flute, violin, cello and piano, with Geneviève Ibanez (piano), Anne Werner-Fuchs (violin), Frédéric Werner (flute), Jean Barthe and Alex Descharnes (cellos), CD, Marcal Classics, MA 060201
 Chanson de l'Orpailler. Complete works for and with guitar. With Philippe Rayer and Michel Guzard (guitares), CD, Quantum, QM 7016
 Askok for guitar and recorder. With Patric Ruby (guitar) and Robin Troman (recorder), CD, Quantum, QM 7031
 Trois silhouettes. With Mireille Saumal (piano). CD, Marcal, MA 040302

Bibliography

External links 
 Official site
 Biography 
Sound recordings of works of the composer from the archives of SRG SSR on Neo.Mx3

Swiss classical composers
French male classical composers
French opera composers
Male opera composers
French ballet composers
École Normale de Musique de Paris alumni
1915 births
Musicians from Geneva
1992 deaths
20th-century French male musicians
Swiss emigrants to France